The Satchmo Legacy is the final studio album by trumpeter Benny Bailey featuring performances associated with Louis Armstrong which was recorded in late 1999 and originally released on the Enja label.

Reception

Alex Henderson of Allmusic says, "On this session, Bailey's playing isn't as forceful, aggressive, and brassy as it was in the 1950s, 1960s, and 1970s, although he is still enjoyable and expressive. The Satchmo Legacy isn't among Bailey's essential albums and isn't recommended to casual listeners, but it's a respectable effort that his diehard fans will appreciate".

Track listing
 "Someday You'll Be Sorry" (Louis Armstrong) – 5:00
 "Ain't Misbehavin'" (Fats Waller, Harry Brooks, Andy Razaf) – 6:53
 "West End Blues" (King Oliver, Clarence Williams) – 7:00
 "After You've Gone" (Turner Layton, Henry Creamer) – 4:39
 "Basin Street Blues" (Spencer Williams) – 5:57
 "Pennies from Heaven" (Arthur Johnston, Johnny Burke) – 4:20
 "Do You Know What It Means to Miss New Orleans?" (Eddie DeLange, Louis Alter) – 6:36
 "Home (When Shadows Fall)" (Harry Clarkson, Jeff Clarkson, Peter van Steeden) – 7:23
 "A Kiss to Build a Dream On" (Bert Kalmar, Harry Ruby, Oscar Hammerstein II) – 6:29

Personnel
Benny Bailey – trumpet, vocals
Bucky Pizzarelli – guitar
John Bunch – piano
Jay Leonhart – bass
Grady Tate – drums
Scott Alan Johnson – Executive Producer
Don Sickler – Producer
Rudy Van Gelder – Recording Engineer
Maureen Sickler – Assistant Engineer
Rudy Van Gelder – Digital Mastering

References

Enja Records albums
Benny Bailey albums
2000 albums
Louis Armstrong tribute albums
Albums recorded at Van Gelder Studio